Balakend, Azerbaijan may refer to:
Balakend, Gadabay
Balakend, Saatly